List of current U.S. flagged cruise ships and river boats in the United States. Due to the Passenger Vessel Services Act of 1886, these are the only overnight passenger ships currently eligible to sail solely between U.S. ports without the need for a foreign port stopover.

Current coastal and ocean-going ships

Current river boats

Ships eligible to sail under American flag 
Passenger ships that are U.S. built, that once sailed under the American flag, and which would be eligible to return to that status:

Laid up 
 United States (1952) - laid up in Philadelphia
Niagara Prince (1994) - laid up when Blount Small Ship Adventures ceased operations in 2020
Grande Caribe (1997) - laid up when Blount Small Ship Adventures ceased operations in 2020
Grande Mariner (1998) - laid up when Blount Small Ship Adventures ceased operations in 2020
 American Eagle (2000) - moored at Chesapeake Shipbuilding as housing for shipyard contractors

Change of registry 
 Safari Voyager (1982) - registry changed to St Kitts
Ocean Voyager (2001) - registry changed to Bahamas
 Ocean Navigator(2004) - registry changed to Bahamas

References 

Cruise ships of the United States
River cruise ships